Camp Bowie is a United States National Guard training center located in west central Texas on the southern outskirts of Brownwood.

History
Camp Bowie, named in honor of the Texas patriot James Bowie, was a military training facility during World War II, and was the third camp in Texas to be so named. From 1940 to 1946 it grew to be one of the largest training centers in Texas.

In 1940, the war situation in Europe caused the United States Congress to determine that it was time to strengthen the defense system. President Franklin D. Roosevelt was handed the power to mobilize the National Guard units. The 36th Division of the Texas National Guard unit arrived at Camp Bowie, located then in Fort Worth, in mid-December for their year's training, but before training was finished, war had been declared.

On September 19, 1940, the War Department announced that a camp would be built at Brownwood. Work began at the campsite on September 27, 1940. The Camp was the first major defense project in the state and there was no scarcity of labor when the building work began.

In 1943, the first German prisoners of war arrived; many were members of Erwin Rommel's Afrika Corps. The 2,700 men worked as day-laborers for the farms in central Texas.

On August 1, 1946 the War Department notified Texas members of Congress that the Camp had been declared "surplus". The Civilian War Assets Administration was to take charge and began the distribution of the land and buildings.

Camp Bowie suffered a large grass fire in July 2008, where several hundred acres of dry grassy areas of the facility were burned.

Camp Bowie remains an active military training station and recently completed construction of new facilities including a firing range and several ammunition storage bunkers.

See also

 Texas Military Forces
 Texas Military Department
 List of conflicts involving the Texas Military
 Awards and decorations of the Texas Military
 List of World War II prisoner-of-war camps in the United States

References

External links
 
 
 Camp Bowie":- Written account from Joseph E Lehman between November 1943 and April 1944" See 2124252930323334
 Camp Bowie - Information from GlobalSecurity.org
 Interview with Heinrich Krahforst, former POW at Camp Bowie from 1943–1945
 Article regarding the POW camp

Buildings and structures in Brown County, Texas
Bowie
Installations of the United States Army National Guard
Military facilities in Texas
1940 establishments in Texas
Texas Military Department
Texas Military Forces